The 23rd Dallas–Fort Worth Film Critics Association Awards honoring the best in film for 2017 were announced on December 13, 2017. These awards "recognizing extraordinary accomplishment in film" are presented annually by the Dallas–Fort Worth Film Critics Association (DFWFCA), based in the Dallas–Fort Worth metroplex region of Texas. The organization, founded in 1990, includes 30 film critics for print, radio, television, and internet publications based in north Texas. The Dallas–Fort Worth Film Critics Association began presenting its annual awards list in 1993.

The Shape of Water was the DFWFCA's most awarded film of 2017, taking five top honors: Best Picture, Best Director (Guillermo del Toro), Best Actress (Sally Hawkins), Best Cinematography, and Best Musical Score.

Winners
Winners are listed first and highlighted with boldface. Other films ranked by the annual poll are listed in order. While most categories saw 5 honorees named, categories ranged from as many as 10 (Best Film) to as few as 2 (Best Animated Film, Best Cinematography, Best Screenplay, and Best Musical Score).

Category awards

Individual awards

Russell Smith Award
 The Florida Project, for "best low-budget or cutting-edge independent film"

References

2017
2017 film awards